Kārlis Kaufmanis (February 21, 1910, Riga, Latvia – June 21, 2003, Clearwater, Florida) was a Latvian-American astronomer.  He is noted for his theory, on which he delivered a public lecture more than a thousand times, that the Star of Bethlehem was a conjunction of the planets Jupiter and Saturn that took place in 7 BC.  He was also the author of several textbooks on astronomy, mathematics, and cosmology.

He held positions at the University of Latvia (1936–40), the French Lyceum (1940–44), and the Esslingen Gymnasium in Germany (1945–48).  He moved to Gustavus Adolphus College in St. Peter, Minnesota as an associate professor in 1949.  He joined the University of Minnesota as a visiting lecturer in 1961 and became an associate professor in 1963.  He held the rank of full professor from 1970 until his retirement in 1978.

From time to time the School of Physics and Astronomy at the University of Minnesota holds the Karlis Kaufmanis Public Lecture.  Speakers have included Clyde Tombaugh, discoverer of the dwarf planet Pluto, Carolyn Porco, noted for imaging work on the Voyager missions, and Michael E. Brown, discoverer of several dwarf planets in the Kuiper belt.

Patron of the University of Latvia 
Kārlis Kaufmanis is a silver patron of the University of Latvia Foundation. In 2003, 100,000 US dollars were bequeathed to the University of Latvia to promote the development of astronomy in Latvia. The will was used as an inviolable capital from which scholarships are paid to talented astronomy students.

Notes and references

External links 
 An article by Kaufmanis on the Star of Bethlehem, reprinted in the newsletter of the University of Minnesota's Department of Astronomy shortly after Kaufmanis' death, starting on page 2
 The Star Of Bethlehem by Karlis Kaufmanis

American astronomers
Latvian emigrants to the United States
Scientists from Riga
Academic staff of the University of Latvia
1910 births
2003 deaths